Medo Yhokha is an Indian politician who is serving as Member of Nagaland Legislative Assembly from Southern Angami-I Assembly constituency and Advisor to Chief Minister of Nagaland.

Personal life 
He was born in 16 May 1977 in Kigwema, Kohima district. He done his university education from Tetso College in 1966, Bachelor of Arts in History from St. Edmund's College, Shillong and Master of Arts in History from North-Eastern Hill University.

References 

Nagaland MLAs 2018–2023

1977 births
Living people